The 2001 Energis Open was a men's tennis tournament played on outdoor clay courts in Amsterdam, Netherlands and was part of the International Series of the 2001 ATP Tour. It was the 42nd edition of the tournament and was held from 16 July until 22 July 2001. Second-seeded Àlex Corretja won the singles title.

Finals

Singles

 Àlex Corretja defeated  Younes El Aynaoui 6–3, 5–7, 7–6(7–0), 3–6, 6–4
 It was Corretja's 1st singles title of the year and the 15th of his career.

Doubles

 Paul Haarhuis /  Sjeng Schalken defeated  Àlex Corretja /  Luis Lobo 6–4, 6–2
 It was Haarhuis' 3rd title of the year and the 54th of his career. It was Schalken's 3rd title of the year and the 11th of his career.

References

External links
Singles draw
Doubles draw
Qualifying Singles draw

Energis Open
Dutch Open (tennis)
2001 in Dutch tennis
Energis Open, 2001